František Čermák and Mikhail Elgin were the defending champions but chose not to defend their title.

Sergio Galdós and Caio Zampieri won the title after defeating Kevin Krawietz and Adrián Menéndez-Maceiras 1–6, 7–6(7–5), [10–7] in the final.

Seeds

Draw

References
 Main Draw

Visit Panamá Cup - Doubles
2017 Doubles